Dytiscus ("little diver" based on Greek δυτικός, "able to dive" and the diminutive suffix -ίσκος) is a Holarctic genus of predaceous diving beetles that usually live in wetlands and ponds. There are 26 species in this genus distributed in Europe, Asia, North Africa and North and Central America. They are predators that can reduce mosquito larvae.

The largest, D. latissimus, is among the largest species in the family and its size is only matched by certain Megadytes. The tarsi of the males are modified into suckers which are used to grip the female in mating. Females are usually larger than the males and come in two forms, with grooved (sulcate) or smooth elytra. Males only ever have smooth elytra. The adults of most species can fly.

Life history
Adult beetles and their larvae are aquatic but the pupae spend their life in the ground. Females lay eggs inside the tissue of aquatic plants such as reeds. The eggs hatch in about three weeks.

The larvae (known as "water tigers") are elongate with a round and flat head and strong mandibles. They are predatory and their mandible have grooves on their inner edge through which they are able to suck the body fluids of their prey. The larvae take air from the surface of the water using hairs at the end of their abdomen. These lead to spiracles into which the air is taken.

Once the larvae grow to some size, they move to soil at the edge of water and burrow into a cell and pupate.

The adults breathe by going to the surface and upending. They collect air under their elytra and are able to breathe this collected air using spiracles hidden under the elytra.

In Dytiscus marginalis and other species the tarsus of the forelegs is modified in males to form a circular sucker. A reduced sucker is also seen in the midleg of the male.

Parasitoids
Eggs of Dytiscus are sometimes parasitized by wasps of the families Eulophidae, Mymaridae and other Chalcidoidea.

Species
Dysticus contains the following species:

 Dytiscus alaskanus J.Balfour-Browne, 1944
 Dytiscus avunculus C.Heyden, 1862
 Dytiscus caraboides Linnaeus, 1758
 Dytiscus carolinus Aubé, 1838
 Dytiscus circumcinctus (Ahrens, 1811)
 Dytiscus circumflexus Fabricius, 1801
 Dytiscus cordieri Aubé, 1838
 Dytiscus dauricus Gebler, 1832
 Dytiscus delictus (Zaitzev, 1906)
 Dytiscus dimidiatus Bergsträsser, 1778
 Dytiscus distantus Feng, 1936
 Dytiscus fasciventris Say, 1824
 Dytiscus habilis Say, 1830
 Dytiscus harrisii Kirby, 1837
 Dytiscus hatchi Wallis, 1950
 Dytiscus hybridus Aubé, 1838
 Dytiscus krausei H.J.Kolbe, 1931
 Dytiscus lapponicus Gyllenhal, 1808
 Dytiscus latahensis Wickham, 1931
 Dytiscus latissimus Linnaeus, 1758
 Dytiscus latro Sharp, 1882
 Dytiscus lavateri Heer, 1847
 Dytiscus marginalis Linnaeus, 1758
 Dytiscus marginicollis LeConte, 1845
 Dytiscus miocenicus Lewis & Gundersen, 1987
 Dytiscus mutinensis Branden, 1885
 Dytiscus persicus Wehncke, 1876
 Dytiscus pisanus Laporte, 1835
 Dytiscus semisulcatus (O.F.Müller, 1776)
 Dytiscus sharpi Wehncke, 1875
 Dytiscus sinensis Feng, 1935
 Dytiscus thianschanicus (Gschwendtner, 1923)
 Dytiscus verticalis Say, 1823
 Dytiscus zersii Sordelli, 1882

References

External links

Dytiscidae genera